Vegetation and Environment monitoring on a New Micro-Satellite (VENµS) is a near polar sun-synchronous orbit microsatellite. It is a joint project of the Israeli Space Agency and CNES. The project was signed upon in April 2005 and was launched on the 2nd of August 2017. The microsatellite, which was set to cost the ISA US$20 million and CNES €10 million, was designed and built by IAI and Rafael under ISA's supervision.

For the mission, CNES is responsible for supplying the superspectral camera and the science mission center. The ISA is responsible for the satellite control center, the technological mission and payload (Israeli Hall effect Thruster and autonomous mission), the spacecraft, and the launcher interface.

History
A joint study to check feasibility of the program was done in the first half of 2005. Phase A started in 2005 and upon completion, a memorandum of understanding was signed between the ISA and CNES. The satellite was originally planned to be launched in 2008; however due to changes of the launchers and several delays, the launch date was pushed to 2 August 2017. It was launched via a Vega launcher from Guiana Space Centre together with Italian satellite OPTSAT-3000.

Mission
The satellite has a scientific and a technological mission. Scientific mission requirements were defined by Centre d'Etudes Spatiales de la BIOsphère, France, and Ben-Gurion University of the Negev, Israel, and CNES. Technological Mission requirement were defined by Rafael.

Scientific mission
The satellite has a 2-day revisit orbit which allows constant viewing angles at constant Sun lighting angles. The unique combination is hoped to allow the development of new image processing methods. A set of at least 50 points of interest around the world were chosen to be scanned throughout the scientific mission. The points will be rescanned every 2 days for the entire duration of the mission where it will collect sensory and imagery data. Some of the objectives from the scientific mission are:

 Monitoring and analyzing surface under various environmental and human factors 
 Develop and validate various ecosystem functioning models
 Improve and validate global carbon cycle models
 Define theoretical and practical methods for scale transfer
 Collect and analyze data collected by the low spatial resolution sensors

The satellite is equipped with a Super Spectral Camera comprises a catadioptric optical system, a  focal plane assembly with narrow band filters, and 4 detector units with 3 separate CCD-TDI array. Each array with separate operational and thermal control.

The satellite is also equipped with a Ritchey-Chretien telescope with a focal length of 1.75m and a diameter of 0.25m. The telescope's tube will be covered to protect it from pollution and dust which will deploy once in orbit.

Technological mission

In addition to its scientific mission, the satellite has a technological mission. The satellite is equipped with Israeli hall effect thrusters (IHET). The mission is to demonstrate the thrusters' enhanced capabilities and autonomous mission operations which include:

 Orbit maintenance
 LEO to LEO orbit transfer
 Enabling imaging mission in a high drag environment - performing the scientific mission at an altitude of 410 km on an Earth repeating sun synchronous orbit

The technological mission is designed to use 16 kg of Xenon.

Platform
The satellite platform is based on the Israel Aerospace Industries OPSAT 3000 satellite platform. Venus satellite will have dual propulsion system: Hydrazine for orbit insertion and Xenon for the technological mission.

Venus satellite mass is 265 kg (wet), of which 16 kg are Xenon and 7 kg are hydrazine.

Ground control station
The satellite is ground controlled by IAI in Israel; the Israel mission control is linked to two sub-stations in charge of each of the missions: The scientific mission is operated from Toulouse Space Center, France and the technology mission is controlled from the Technological Mission Center, Rafael, Haifa, Israel.

See also
 CNES
 Israel Space Agency
 2014 in spaceflight
 Israel Aerospace Industries
 Vega
 Ritchey–Chrétien telescope

References

External links 
 CNES VENµS Mission Page
  Building the VENUS satellite, Israel Aerospace Industries, Ministry of Science, Technology and Space \ Israel Space Agency May 2017, on YouTube
  Meet the VENUS satellite, Ministry of Science, Technology and Space \ Israel Space Agency, January 2017
 Jerusalem from space: First images of the satellite VENUS  Hebrew , Ynet news, 23 August 2017

IAI satellites
Spacecraft launched in 2017
Earth observation satellites of Israel
Satellites of France
2017 in Israel
2017 in France
Spacecraft launched by Vega rockets
Israeli inventions